Sogno is the fifth studio album by Italian tenor Andrea Bocelli.

The album sold 2.5 million copies in the United States, and over 10 million copies worldwide. Bocelli was subsequently nominated for Best New Artist at the Grammys, the first and so far only time a classical artist had been nominated in the category since 1961.

Release
Sogno was released internationally on April 6, 1999.

The album was released in Spanish under the name Sueño.

Accolades
In 1999, Bocelli was nominated for Best New Artist at the Grammys, which marked the first time a classical artist had been nominated in the category in 38 years.

His duet with Celine Dion, "The Prayer," originally appeared as a solo version (for Celine Dion) in the 1998 animated film Quest for Camelot, and won the Golden Globe for Best Original Song as well as being nominated for an Academy Award for Best Original Song.

Commercial performance
Sogno entered the upper reaches of the pop album charts around the world, giving birth to the phenomenon of "Bocellimania".

The album sold 2.5 million copies in America, and over 10 million copies worldwide.

Track listing
"Canto della Terra" (Francesco Sartori, Lucio Quarantotto) – 4:02
"The Prayer" (with Celine Dion) (David Foster, Carole Bayer Sager) – 4:30
"Sogno" (Giuseppe Francesco Servillo, Giuseppe Vessicchio) – 4:03
"'O Mare E Tu" (with Dulce Pontes) (Enzo Gragnaniello) – 4:36
"A Volte Il Cuore" (Piero Marras) – 4:44
"Cantico" (Mauro Malavasi, Pierpaolo Guerrini, Andrea Bocelli) – 4:01
"Mai Più Così Lontano" (Mauro Malavasi) – 4:20
"Immenso" (Francesco Sartori, Lucio Quarantotto) – 4:51
"Nel Cuore Lei" (with Eros Ramazzotti) (Bruno Zambrini, Dedo Cogliati) – 3:48
"Tremo E T'Amo" (Tullio Ferro, Giuseppe Francesco Servillo) – 4:51
"I Love Rossini" (Patrick Abrial, Giuseppe Francesco Servillo) – 3:56
"Un Canto" (Ennio Morricone, Sergio Bardotti) – 4:35
"Come Un Fiume Tu" (Ennio Morricone, Lucio Quarantotto) – 4:47
"A Mio Padre (6 Maggio 1992)" (Mauro Malavasi, Andrea Bocelli) – 4:00

Charts

Weekly charts

Year-end charts

Certifications and sales

References 

1999 albums
Andrea Bocelli albums
Classical crossover albums